Kelvin Orlando Moore (September 26, 1957 – November 9, 2014) was a Major League Baseball first baseman. He played parts of three seasons in the major leagues, from  until , for the Oakland Athletics. He attended Leroy High School and Jackson State University, where he was drafted in the sixth round of the 1978 MLB draft. He died on November 9, 2014.

References

External links
, or Retrosheet
Pura Pelota (Venezuelan Winter League)

1957 births
2014 deaths
African-American baseball players
American expatriate baseball players in Canada
Baseball players from Alabama
Buffalo Bisons (minor league) players
El Paso Diablos players
Jackson State Tigers baseball players
Jackson State University alumni
Jersey City A's players
Major League Baseball first basemen
Modesto A's players
Oakland Athletics players
Ogden A's players
People from Leroy, Alabama
Tacoma Tigers players
Tiburones de La Guaira players
American expatriate baseball players in Venezuela
Tidewater Tides players
Vancouver Canadians players
Waterbury A's players
20th-century African-American sportspeople
21st-century African-American people